Osmancık District is a district of the Çorum Province of Turkey. Its seat is the town of Osmancık. Its area is 1,273 km2, and its population is 43,297 (2022).

Composition
There is one municipality in Osmancık District:
 Osmancık

There are 55 villages in Osmancık District:

 Ağıroğlan
 Akören
 Alibey
 Ardıç
 Aşağızeytin
 Aşıkbükü
 Avlağı
 Aydınköy
 Baldıran
 Baltacımehmetpaşa
 Başpınar
 Belkavak
 Çampınar
 Çatak
 Çayırköy
 Danişment
 Deliler
 Doğanköy
 Durucasu
 Evlik
 Fındıcak
 Fındıkköy
 Gecek
 Girinoğlan
 Gökdere
 Güneşören
 Güvercinlik
 Hanefi
 İnal
 İncesu
 Kamil
 Karaçay
 Karaköy
 Karalargüney
 Kargı
 Kızıltepe
 Konaca
 Kumbaba
 Kuz
 Kuzhayat
 Öbektaş
 Ovacıksuyu
 Pelitçik
 Sarıalan
 Sarpunkavak
 Seki
 Sekibağı
 Sütlüce
 Tekmen
 Tepeyolaltı
 Umaç
 Yağsüzen
 Yaylabaşı
 Yenidanişment
 Yukarızeytin

Population

References

Districts of Çorum Province